Marnie Breckenridge is an American singer based out of New York City. She is a soprano performing opera, classical music, operetta and classical sacred music.

She graduated from Pacific Union College in Angwin, overlooking the Napa Valley, with a bachelor's degree in music in 1993. She went on to get a Master of Music degree from the San Francisco Conservatory of Music.

Celebrated for her roles in contemporary opera, she originated the role of Mother in David T. Little and Royce Vavrek's Dog Days in 2012.  In 2020 she was awarded the Dora Mavor Moore Award for Outstanding Performance by an Individual in the operatic field for her performance as Jacqueline du Pré in Luna Pearl Woolf and Royce Vavrek's world premiere presentation of Jacqueline presented by Tapestry Opera.

Notable World Premieres
 Dog Days (2012, David T. Little, composer; Royce Vavrek, librettist)
 Today it Rains (2019, Laura Kaminsky, composer; Mark Campbell and Kimberly Reid, librettists)
 Jacqueline (2020, Luna Pearl Woolf, composer; Royce Vavrek, librettist)

References

Living people
American operatic sopranos
Pacific Union College alumni
San Francisco Conservatory of Music alumni
Singers from California
Classical musicians from California
Year of birth missing (living people)
21st-century American women